Damron is a surname. Notable people with the surname include:

Dane Damron, American football player and coach
Dick Damron (born 1934), Canadian country music singer-songwriter
J.R. Damron, American politician
Robert Damron (born 1972), American golfer
Robert Damron (politician) (born 1954), American investment banker